All News Channel (ANC) was an American satellite television news channel that was owned by CONUS Communications, a joint venture between Viacom and Hubbard Broadcasting. The channel was carried mainly on direct-broadcast satellite provider DirecTV (and prior to that, USSB, which was folded into DirecTV in 1999). All News Channel's programming was also syndicated to television stations across the United States. The channel was headquartered in St. Paul, Minnesota, out of the facility of Hubbard's flagship station KSTP-TV (channel 5), the ABC affiliate for the Minneapolis–St. Paul market. The channel ceased broadcasting on September 30, 2002.

History
All News Channel was launched on January 1, 1989, through a partnership formed between Viacom and Hubbard called CONUS Communications (CONUS being an acronym for Continental U.S.), which included a news video-sharing service for local television stations nationwide, particularly those affiliated with a major broadcast network. Nearly all of ANC's video came from these stations, who in turn utilized satellite news-gathering trucks that had been invented, built and sold by Hubbard beginning in 1984. CONUS also maintained a small news bureau in Washington, D.C. It was the second nationwide challenger to established cable news channel CNN after the Satellite News Channel (SNC), as well as the first since SNC folded in 1983. 

All-News Channel also produced news content for third parties. From shortly after its inception until the early 1990s, All News Channel produced daily news updates that aired on Showtime (at the time, owned by ANC co-parent Viacom) during the premium channel's promo breaks. The channel also produced similar updates for USA Network from 1993 to 2000; the news briefs were originally produced at KYW-TV in Philadelphia (which had been producing other news services for parent Group W), but management and newscast changes at that station caused the network to move production. From 1991 to 1994, VH1 (also owned by Viacom) carried All News Channel-produced interstitials during the morning block Hits, News & Weather. ANC also produced the syndicated morning business news program First Business, before its national distribution rights were transferred to MGM Television shortly after ANC's shut down.

All News Channel was never profitable throughout its history and could not withstand the challenges of MSNBC and Fox News Channel (ironically, Rupert Murdoch made an offer to buy ANC from the Hubbards to serve as the cornerstone for what would become FNC; the Hubbards refused to sell), which pushed ANC to fifth place in the ratings among all cable news channels (behind Headline News). It benefited in part by being the only news channel on the USSB satellite service (USSB, as with ANC, was owned by Hubbard Broadcasting); after USSB merged into DirecTV, it was then one of five such channels, and it no longer had the explicit backing of its satellite provider.

The channel shut down on September 30, 2002, with veteran anchor Stan Turner thanking those watching and those behind the scenes; stations that carried ANC have since replaced the channel's programming with syndicated and/or paid programming (especially common with NBC stations as the network no longer has an overnight newscast since NBC Nightside ended in 1998) or have expanded their clearance of overnight news programs supplied by their affiliated network.

Format
ANC aired up to five live half-hour newscasts each day (airing at 4:00 a.m., 8:00 a.m., 12:00 p.m., 4:00 p.m., and 10:00 p.m. Central Time, with an occasional sixth at 4:30 a.m.), with each edition being repeated until the next live newscast aired; however, exceptions to this set scheduling were made for major breaking news stories.

If mistakes were made during the live broadcasts, a corrected segment would be produced (sometimes live) for the repeat broadcasts. ANC operated on a fixed schedule, where each news block ran the same length every day, and commercials (which consisted mainly of direct response advertisements, and by the mid-1990s, promos for USSB's – and later DirecTV's – slate of general entertainment and premium channels; the latter type of ads were also seen on some stations that carried the channel's programming at times) aired at the same time every day. The on-air talent was mostly exclusive to All News Channel, though some anchors from KSTP also served as ANC anchors, most notably Stan Turner; KSTP producers also recorded weather segments for All News Channel until 2002. Later, ANC show producers voiced their own weather segments, along with other stories.

Broadcast television stations in many markets carried All News Channel programming during the overnight hours in lieu of signing off, or scheduling movies, infomercials or other syndicated programming to fill overnight and early morning timeslots (similar to the overnight carriage of Headline News that was also common among stations during the same timeframe). In later years, as NBC, ABC and CBS launched their own overnight news programs, ANC programming continued to air on stations affiliated with those networks as a complement to these programs and also to provide news programming in weekend time periods when network overnight newscasts were not airing. For a time in the early 1990s, KSTP aired ANC programming overnights in half-hour blocks, alongside local news reports, branded as Eyewitness News All Night. In addition, since ANC's newscasts never contained any copyrighted music (by design), stations broadcasting the ANC feed could stay on the air longer without increasing their ASCAP, Broadcast Music Incorporated (BMI), and/or SESAC fees.

External links
All News Channel video 11 Sep 2001 c. 1200 CDT
All News Channel clip 11 Sep 2001 c. 2200 CDT

References

Defunct television networks in the United States
Television channels and stations established in 1989
Television channels and stations disestablished in 2002
Hubbard Broadcasting
Former Viacom subsidiaries